The Minneapolis Mayhem Rugby Football Club is one of the nation’s few male rugby clubs that makes the sport accessible to traditionally underrepresented groups, including people of color and gay men.
 
"Our goal is to foster local, regional, national and international participation and competition in the game of Rugby Union Football, and to create an environment where members of the community can learn the laws and practice of Rugby, thus improving their capabilities as players."

Since forming in 2004, the Mayhem have been fortunate enough to play against teams from Minnesota, across the country, and around the world.  Mayhem RFC is a member of the Minnesota Rugby Football Union (MNRFU), the Midwest Rugby Football Union (MRFU), USA Rugby, and International Gay Rugby Association and Board (IGRAB). The Division III club trains and plays regularly in Minneapolis at Harrison Park.

History
Dave Peil, then owner of Grumpy’s Bar in Minneapolis, worked with a local rugby club The Metropolis RFC hosting fundraisers and third halves, tossed around the idea of starting a new predominantly gay rugby club.

Following the model laid out in the “” primer by San Francisco Fog RFC founder Derrick Mickle, Peil set out generating interest through posters in bars, talking to whoever would listen, and starting a Yahoo Group (TCGayRugby) to communicate with interested people.  The interest came in from around the country, board members from clubs in larger cities offering advice and words of caution that it may take a year to get enough players to field a team.

By November 2004 the outline for the future of the club was in place.  A short-term goal was enough members to make strong showing at the Pride Festival in June 2005, a major recruiting opportunity.

The first board was elected on February 26 2005, naming newly founded team the Minneapolis Freeze.  The name was then officially changed on March 6 when it was discovered there was an inactive club in Northern MN who had that name.  The second choice of The Minneapolis Mayhem was chosen and continues today.
 
The first practice was on March 2 2005, held under the Hennepin Avenue Bridge in Minneapolis.  22 people came out for the first practice.

The cheer of the Mayhem is "Tahi! Rua! Toru! Mayhem! Mayhem! Mayhem!" which is "1, 2 ,3..." in Maori.

Bingham Cup
The Mayhem played in their first Bingham Cup in 2006, hosted by the Gotham Knights in New York, NY.  Just over 12 months after forming, the Minneapolis Mayhem placed 5th out of 10 teams in the Plate Division.

The Minneapolis Mayhem submitted a bid to host the Bingham Cup in 2010. The only other team to submit a bid was the Sin City Irish RFC, a non-IGRAB, team. On January 21, 2009, it was announced that the Minneapolis Mayhem will host the 2010 Bingham Cup at the National Sports Center in Blaine, Minnesota.

References

External links
 

American rugby union teams
International Gay Rugby member clubs
Sports in Minneapolis
Rugby union teams in Minnesota